The  Edinburgh International Television Festival is an annual media event held in the United Kingdom each August which brings together delegates from the television and digital world to debate the major issues facing the industry.

The Festival draws about 2,000 delegates from the major networks and production companies internationally. Although the festival is held in Edinburgh, its headquarters are in London.

History and outline
Over the years, the Festival has attracted industry figures including Kevin Spacey, Rupert Murdoch, Ted Turner, Ricky Gervais, Vince Gilligan, Tessa Ross, Jamie Oliver, Simon Cowell, Ted Sarandos and Elisabeth Murdoch, as well as people from related fields such as Al Gore and Germaine Greer.

Established in 1976, the Festival takes place every August at the Edinburgh International Conference Centre concurrently with the Edinburgh International Festival, and similar events, in the city. The Edinburgh International Television Festival remains the only event both run by and for the television industry, being governed by its own Executive and Advisory committees. The Festival is a charitable organisation.

The Festival run two talent schemes – "The Network" (formerly known as TVYP) which gives new entrants a first step into the TV and digital industries, while "Ones to Watch" (formerly known as Fast Track) supports those at the early stages of their career. Both benefit from fully funded places at the Festival, which include tailored workshops, masterclasses and networking. Year-round mentoring, training and events are also offered.

The Festival runs other events throughout the year. These include EdTalks lectures and Q & A's with channel bosses from across the globe.

The MacTaggart Lecture

The Festival is best known for its keynote address: the James MacTaggart Memorial Lecture. The lecture features speeches from leading media figures connected with British and international television over more than 40 years.

 All job titles as at the time the lecture was given. Nationality/citizenship is British unless stated otherwise.

See also

 List of television festivals

References

External links

Edinburgh Festival
Festivals in Edinburgh
Recurring events established in 1976
Television festivals
1976 establishments in Scotland